Lepterpeton is an extinct genus of nectridean lepospondyl within the family Urocordylidae.

See also
 Prehistoric amphibian
 List of prehistoric amphibians

Holospondyls